Events from the year 1707 in Canada.

Incumbents
French Monarch: Louis XIV
English, Scottish and Irish Monarch (until May 1, 1707), British and Irish Monarch (beginning May 1, 1707): Anne

Governors
Governor General of New France: Philippe de Rigaud Vaudreuil
Governor of Acadia: Daniel d'Auger de Subercase
Colonial Governor of Louisiana: Jean-Baptiste Le Moyne de Bienville
Governor of Plaisance: Philippe Pastour de Costebelle

Events
 Port Royal is attacked twice by the English from Massachusetts.

Deaths
Jean-Vincent d'Abbadie de Saint-Castin (born 1652)

References 

 
Canada
07